Masimiliano Doda (born 17 November 2000) is an Albanian professional footballer who plays as a right-back for Italian  club Imolese, on loan from Palermo.

Club career 
A Sampdoria youth product, Doda was released from the Blucerchiati in 2019 without making a senior appearance. He successively signed for then-Serie D club Palermo on a free transfer, being part of the Rosanero in their first season following the club bankruptcy of June 2019.

After playing 21 games in the 2019–20 Serie D season that was cut short due to the COVID-19 pandemic in Italy, he signed a three-year professional contract with Palermo in July 2020 following the club's promotion to Serie C.

On 17 January 2023, after making no appearances for the Rosanero in the first half of the 2022–23 Serie B campaign, Doda was loaned out to Serie C side Imolese until the end of the season.

International career 
Doda is a youth international for Albania. He received his first call-up for the Albania U21 national team in June 2021.

Personal life 
Doda is the son of an Albanian former football defender who successively relocated to Genoa for work with his family. He has a younger brother, Armelo, who was a youth player for Sampdoria.

Career statistics

Club

References

2000 births
Living people
Albanian footballers
Association football fullbacks
Palermo F.C. players
Imolese Calcio 1919 players
Serie C players
Serie D players
Albanian expatriate footballers
Expatriate footballers in Italy
Albanian expatriate sportspeople in Italy